Liptena boei is a butterfly in the family Lycaenidae. It is found in western Cameroon. The habitat consists of submontane forests.

References

Butterflies described in 1993
Liptena
Endemic fauna of Cameroon
Butterflies of Africa